The canton of Le Bassin chaurien is an administrative division of the Aude department, southern France. It was created at the French canton reorganisation which came into effect in March 2015. Its seat is in Castelnaudary.

It consists of the following communes:
 
Airoux
Les Cassés
Castelnaudary
Fendeille
Issel
Labastide-d'Anjou
Lasbordes
Mas-Saintes-Puelles
Montferrand
Montmaur
Peyrens
La Pomarède
Puginier
Ricaud
Saint-Martin-Lalande
Saint-Papoul
Saint-Paulet
Souilhanels
Souilhe
Soupex
Tréville
Villeneuve-la-Comptal

References

Cantons of Aude